The 2001–02 Austrian Hockey League season was the 72nd season of the Austrian Hockey League, the top level of ice hockey in Austria. Nine teams participated in the league, and EC VSV won the championship.

Regular season

Playoffs

External links
Austrian Ice Hockey Association

Aus
1
Austrian Hockey League seasons